The 2010 IIHF World Championship rosters consisted of 395 players from 16 national ice hockey teams. Run by the International Ice Hockey Federation (IIHF), the 2010 IIHF World Championship, held in Cologne, Gelsenkirchen and Mannheim, Germany, was the 74th edition of the tournament. The Czech Republic won the championship for the sixth time after defeating Russia 2–1 in the final.

Before the start of the championship, each participating nation had to submit a list of players for its roster. A minimum of fifteen skaters and two goaltenders and a maximum of twenty skaters and three goaltenders had to be selected. A country that had selected fewer than the maximum allowed were required to choose the remaining players prior to the start of the tournament. After the start of the tournament, each team was allowed to add an additional two players to their roster, for a maximum of 25. Once players were registered to the team, they could not be removed from the roster.

To have qualified for the national team under IIHF rules, a player must have met several criteria. He must be a citizen of the nation, and be under the jurisdiction of that national association. Players are allowed to switch which national team they play for, providing they fulfill the IIHF criteria. If participating for the first time in an IIHF event, the player was required to have played two consecutive years in the national competition of the new country without playing in another country. If the player has already played for a national team before, he may switch countries if he is a citizen of the new country, and has played for four consecutive years in the national competition of the new country. This switch may happen only once in the player's life.

Dennis Endras of Germany led the tournament in goaltending with a save percentage of 0.961, and was named the tournament's most valuable player and top goaltender by the IIHF directorate. Russian Pavel Datsyuk was named top forward and Petteri Nummelin of Finland was selected as top defenceman. Russia's Ilya Kovalchuk was the tournament's leading scorer with 12 points.



Legend

Belarus
 Head coach:

Skaters

Goaltenders

Canada
 Head coach:

Skaters

Goaltenders

Czech Republic
 Head coach:

Skaters

Goaltenders

Denmark
 Head coach:

Skaters

Goaltenders

Finland
 Head coach:

Skaters

Goaltenders

France
 Head coach:

Skaters

Goaltenders

Germany
 Head coach:

Skaters

Goaltenders

Italy
 Head coach:

Skaters

Goaltenders

Kazakhstan
 Head coach:

Skaters

Goaltenders

Latvia
 Head coach:

Skaters

Goaltenders

Norway
 Head coach:

Skaters

Goaltenders

Russia
 Head coach:

Skaters

Goaltenders

Slovakia
 Head coach:

Skaters

Goaltenders

Sweden
 Head coach:

Skaters

Goaltenders

Switzerland
 Head coach:

Skaters

Goaltenders

United States
 Head coach:

Skaters

Goaltenders

References

Player statistics

Team rosters

Teams
 
 
 
 
 
 
 
  
 
 
 
 
 
 
 

rosters
IIHF World Championship rosters